High-speed voice and data link (HVDL) is a high speed voice and data provisioning method that allows telcos and ISPs to provide up to three voice channels and data (up to 1Mbit/s) on a copper pair over extremely long local loops.

Most DSL technologies (Etherloop in particular) work well up to about 18,000 feet (5.5 km) on a 24 AWG copper pair.  Reach DSL supports lengths up to approximately 32,800 feet (10 km).  HVDL has a theoretical maximum loop length of approximately 112,000 feet (approximately 34 km).  Such a distance would require repeater(s) and would probably only support a connection of 128 kbit/s.  The ideal speed for this service is 512 kbit/s or 384 kbit/s.  This is programmed directly from the COT line card.

The signal is sent from the telco's central office as an Ethernet style signal and is demuxed at the customer's premises by a POTS/Ethernet splitter.  The box itself contains all the circuitry needed to split the data and voice channels. An Ethernet cable is run directly to the customer's PC or router, and the POTS lines within the home are connected to the POTS terminals inside the customer-premises equipment (CPE) unit.  The CPE unit is powered from the telco's central office, and will continue to work during a power outage, and supports failover-to-POTS.

External links 
 HVDL vendor Charles

Communication circuits
Digital subscriber line